Jacob Iceton (22 October 1903 – 1981) was an English professional footballer who played in the Football League for Fulham, Clapton Orient and Aldershot as a goalkeeper.

Career statistics

Honours 
Fulham

 Football League Third Division South: 1931–32

References 

English Football League players
English footballers
Leyton Orient F.C. players
Association football goalkeepers
1903 births
1981 deaths
Footballers from County Durham
Cockfield F.C. players
Hull City A.F.C. players
Shildon A.F.C. players
Fulham F.C. players
Aldershot F.C. players
Worcester City F.C. players
Clapton Orient F.C. wartime guest players
People from West Auckland